Kalophrynus robinsoni (common names: Robinson's grainy frog, Pahang Mountain sticky frog) is a species of frog in the family Microhylidae. It is endemic to Pahang in central  Peninsular Malaysia. The specific name robinsoni honours Herbert C. Robinson, a British zoologist and ornithologist. This poorly known species has not been reported since 1922.

Description
Males measure  and female(s)  in snout–vent length; it is uncertain whether these are juveniles or adults. The snout is short and truncate. The tympanum is visible and about two-thirds of the eye diameter. The toes are one-third webbed and have bluntly pointed tips. The dorsum is light brown and has an elongated X-shaped mark, extending from the eyelids to the groin. The venter is yellowish with brown spots and speckles.

Habitat and conservation
Its natural habitat is, presumably, primary rainforest. The type locality is within the Taman Negara National Park.

References

robinsoni
Amphibians of Malaysia
Endemic fauna of Malaysia
Amphibians described in 1922
Taxa named by Malcolm Arthur Smith
Taxonomy articles created by Polbot